Reza Qoli Mirza Afshar (1719–1749) was the first son of the Afsharid conqueror Nader Shah. When Nader came under the service of a Persian nobleman who hired him as a courier, Nader killed his assistant courier. Though his speech to the Persian king Sultan Husayn convinced the king to pardon him, when Nader returned to his employer the nobleman was angered and Nader suspected he would try and kill him. To make it worse Nader had fallen in love with the nobleman's daughter and wished to marry her. When the nobleman refused the marriage proposal, Nader killed him and ran off with his daughter into the mountains where Reza Qoli Mirza was born. Reza, being the only child from Nader's first marriage, held a special status amongst the Shah's sons and was given the title of viceroy when Nader left Persia on a military expedition to Mughal India. He proved himself a competent commander who side by side with Nader's veteran lieutenant Tahmasp Khan Jalayer, defeated the Uzbek armies to the east of the empire although Nader ordered a halt to hostilities.

After Nader's triumphal return from his victories in India and central Asia, he and Reza Qoli became increasingly suspicious of one another, a matter hardly helped by Nader's deteriorating mental health. After a failed assassination attempt matters came to a head and Nader imprisoned his son accusing him of being the conspirator. In a fit of rage Nader ordered Reza's eyes be cut out but when presented with the gory spectacle of his son's two dismembered eyeballs he immediately regretted his deed.

Having lost his eyes Reza also lost his position as the successor of his father. He was later executed by one of Nader's successors, Adil Shah, in a bid to remove any rival claimants to the throne.

See also
Joseph von Semlin

References

Afsharid dynasty
1719 births
1747 deaths
18th-century Iranian military personnel
Afsharid generals
Date of birth unknown
Place of birth unknown
Date of death unknown
Place of death unknown
Executed Iranian people